Robert Barker (1563 – 5 April 1618) was an English politician.

Biography
He was the third son of John Barker, a merchant of Bildeston, Suffolk. He was educated at St John's College, Cambridge and trained for law at the Inner Temple.

He was the Member of Parliament for Colchester, Essex four times between 1597 and 1621.

He became a JP for Harwich in 1601 and Essex in 1607 (until 1617) and was made Serjeant-at-Law for Colchester in 1612. He died in at Monkwick in 1618.

Family
He had married Margaret, the daughter of Robert Coke of Mileham, Suffolk; they had two sons and three daughters. he was succeeded by his eldest son Bestney.

Notes

References

1563 births
1618 deaths
People from Bildeston
Alumni of St John's College, Cambridge
Serjeants-at-law (England)
English MPs 1597–1598
English MPs 1601
English MPs 1604–1611
English MPs 1614
16th-century English lawyers